Bernards may refer to:

 Bernards High School, a comprehensive four-year regional public high school located in Bernardsville, New Jersey
 Bernards Township, New Jersey, United States

People with the surname
 Kori Bernards (born 1953), Vice President of Corporate Communications for the Motion Picture Association of America
 René Bernards (born 1953), Dutch cancer researcher

See also

 Bernard